Traveller is a science fiction role-playing game first published in 1977 by Game Designers' Workshop. Marc Miller designed Traveller with help from Frank Chadwick, John Harshman, and Loren Wiseman. Editions were published for GURPS, d20, and other role-playing game systems. From its origin and in the currently published systems, the game relied upon six-sided dice for random elements. Traveller has been featured in a few novels and at least two video games.

Design 

Traveller is a tabletop role-playing game. Characters journey between star systems, engaging in exploration, ground and space battles, and interstellar trading. One player, the game master or referee, oversees task attempts and guides events as the players explore the setting.

Characters are defined not by the need to increase native skill and ability but by achievements, discoveries, wealth, titles, and political power.

Influences and inspiration
Marc Miller lists a number of books that influenced Traveller and provided its key features:

 Dorsai, Gordon R. Dickson, 1960
 Dumarest of Terra saga, Edwin Charles Tubb, 1967-2008
 Envoy to New Worlds, Keith Laumer, 1963
 Hammer's Slammers, David Drake, 1979
 Retief's Peace, Keith Laumer, William H. Keith, 2005
 Space Viking, H. Beam Piper, 1963
 The Cosmic Computer, H. Beam Piper, 1963

Key features
Some of these key features include:

 Commerce: Commerce is the major driving force of civilization.
 Human-centric but cosmopolitan: The core rules focus on human characters, but there is support for using and playing aliens.
 Limited communication: There is no faster-than-light information transfer – meaning no ansible, subspace radio, or similar. Communication is limited to the speed of travel. Decisions are made on the local level rather than by a remote authority.
 Morals and mortality: People remain people and continue to show courage, wisdom, honesty and justice, along with cowardice, deceit, and criminal behavior.
 Sociological: Interstellar society is socially stratified (high, mid, and low passage; SOC (Social Status) is a primary character attribute). Affairs are often managed by independent nobility, who make use of classic titles such as Baron, Duke and Archduke.

Characters 
Traveller uses a lifepath-style system for character generation. Characters get skills and experience in a mini-game where the player makes career choices determining the character's life up to the point before adventuring begins.

A character can be human, robot, alien, or of a genetically engineered species. A character can be civilian, military, or noble, a young cadet, or a tried-and-true veteran, each with strengths and weaknesses. Death during character generation is possible in some editions, a mechanic that became infamous.

Characters have six primary characteristics: strength, dexterity, endurance, intelligence, education, and social standing. These characteristics are generated by a roll of two six-sided dice. Other general characteristics also exist, such as psionics and sanity. There are also variant characteristics, such as charisma and caste, which replace a primary characteristic, to add nuance to alien characters.

Some characters have extra-sensory perception, telekinesis, telepathy, and other psychic abilities, which are organized and standardized into "psionics".

Equipment 

Equipment emphasizes wilderness exploration, hazardous environments, and combat. As a result, equipment lists are heavy on vehicles, sensor equipment, communicators, rations, personal armor, and weapons.

 Low-technology Since primitive worlds exist near technological worlds, primitive weapons such as swords, shields, pikes, and bows are included. Characters often have some sort of blade skill for close combat.
 High-technology Cybernetics and non-sentient robots also show up in equipment lists, as do artifacts from ancient civilizations.
 Hard Sci-fi Flavor Along with energy weapons, there is also a strong presence of slug-throwing weapons such as rifles and pistols. The prevailing theory is that (usually) the most efficient way to stop someone is with kinetic energy (e.g. bullets).

Starships 
Starships range from small one-person scouts, to giant planetoid colony ships. Design rules balance power, life support, and defenses for consistent ships. It is complex enough to be able to generically represent most starships used in role-playing games and flexible enough to support custom add-ons to the system. (GDW published several board games allowing Traveller space battles to be played out as games in their own right - Mayday uses the Traveller rules, while Brilliant Lances and Battle Rider use the Traveller: The New Era rules.)

Worlds 
Worlds range from barren planetoid moons to large gas giant worlds, from uncolonized territories to planets with billions of people. The world generation rules produce a random mix of worlds.

Setting 
The original booklets contain generic rules for running science fiction role-playing games with no official setting. But in the adventures and supplements, a suggested setting emerges. In this setting, the human-dominated Third Imperium is the largest interstellar empire in charted space, a feudalistic union of worlds, where local nobility operate largely free from oversight and restricted by convention and feudal obligations.

Races 
The setting features descendants of humanity who are collectively called Humaniti. These include the Solomani, humans emigrated from Earth within the last few thousand years, the Vilani, humans transplanted from Earth tens of thousands of years ago by the Ancients (see below) who founded the First Imperium, and the Zhodani, psychic humans ruled by psionically-gifted nobles.

Despite the thematic dominance of the human race, with most adventures taking place in human space, the Traveller universe is cosmopolitan and contains many technologically advanced species known as sophonts, a term borrowed from earlier science fiction material. The setting principally concerns itself with six major races that developed faster-than-light travel independently. In addition to Humaniti, the standard list of major races includes the honor-bound catlike Aslan, the winged lizard-like Droyne, the sixfold-symmetric and manipulative Hivers, the centaur-like militant vegetarian K'kree, and the wolf-hybrid Vargr.

Additional minor races are numerous. An early publication from GDW notes that "The minor races, of which there are hundreds within the area of known space, will be largely left up to individual referees." GDW's quarterly publication, the Journal of the Travellers Aid Society designed by Loren K. Wiseman, sketched out about one race per quarter, starting with the Aslan in Issue 7. Taken together with aliens casually mentioned or introduced in separate scenarios or adventures—often arbitrarily—there is therefore no indication that the number of minor races is limited in any sense.

Ancients 
The Ancients were a major race in the distant past; their ruins dot planets throughout charted space and their artifacts are more technically advanced than those of any existing civilization. For unknown reasons, they transplanted humans from Earth to dozens of worlds, uplifted Terran wolves to create the Vargr and transplanted them to another world, and undertook many megascale engineering projects before destroying their civilization in a catastrophic civil war.

Publishing history

Format 

The original gamebooks were black and digest-sized (known as the "little black books") produced by Game Designers' Workshop (GDW). The main rules were detailed in three such booklets, sold as a boxed set while the same format was used for early support material, such as the adventures, supplements and further books. Later supplements and updated versions of the main game system introduced full sized booklets, complete re-writes of the game system and significant changes to the Third Imperium.

Editions 

Though nearly all older versions of Traveller are available in PDF format, Traveller5 and Mongoose Traveller 2nd Ed. are the current rulesets. Both rely on six-sided dice and both draw from the original Traveller rules.

Traveller 
The original version was designed and published by GDW in 1977. The core rules originally came as a box set of three black digest-sized books, and were later compiled into a single volume rulebook. Supplemental booklets included advanced character generation, capital ship design, robots, and more. Eight boxed wargames were released as tie-in products. This edition is also sometimes called by the retronym Classic Traveller.

MegaTraveller 
A new edition, published by GDW in 1987 and designed by Digest Group Publications. The game system used revised rules developed in DGP's Traveller's Digest periodical. The game was set during the rebellion which shattered the Imperium. Supplements and magazines produced during this era detailed the progression of the rebellion from the initial assassination of the Emperor in 1116 to the collapse of large-scale interstellar trade in roughly 1124 (the beginning of the supplement Hard Times).

Traveller: The New Era 
Published in 1993, this was the final edition published by GDW. Set in the former territory of the Third Imperium after interstellar government and society had largely collapsed. TNE introduced Virus, a silicon-chip life form that infected and took over computers. The game mechanics used GDW's house system, derived from Twilight: 2000, 2nd Ed. The game used a more realism-centered approach to science fiction, doing away with reactionless thrusters, shortening laser ranges to a reasonable distance, etc.

Marc Miller's Traveller 
Published by Imperium Games in 1996, T4 is set in the early days of the Third Imperium (Milieu 0), with the small, newly formed empire surrounded by regressed or barbaric worlds. The mechanics and text resemble a mix of Classic Traveller and The New Era.

GURPS Traveller 

Designed by Loren K. Wiseman and published in 1998, GURPS Traveller uses the third edition of the GURPS system and takes place in an alternate timeline in which no Rebellion occurred and Virus was never released. Steve Jackson Games produced numerous supplements for the line, including details for all of the major races, many of the minor races, interstellar trade, expanded world generation, the military forces of the Third Imperium, and starships.

Traveller20  
Published by QuickLink Interactive (QLI) in 2002, this version uses the d20 System as its base and is set at the time of the Solomani Rim War around Imperial year 990, about a century before the era depicted in the original game. The preferred setting is the Gateway Domain region of the Imperium. After the company's license to the Traveller brand and setting lapsed, the purely mechanical elements of this game were republished as the generic SciFi20 system.

GURPS Traveller: Interstellar Wars
In 2006, Steve Jackson Games released GURPS Traveller: Interstellar Wars (GTISW, sometimes GTIW) for the 4th edition of GURPS from 2004. The timeline was rolled back to 2170, which is several millennia earlier than the usual Traveller setting, to the early days of Earth's presence in space at the time when Earth first started to send out interstellar ships to include the period just after the Third Interstellar War between the Terran Confederation (Earth) and the gigantic Ziru Sirka Empire (Vland).

Traveller Hero 
A port of the Traveller setting to the Hero System, produced under license by Comstar Games in 2006.

Mongoose Traveller
Mongoose Publishing published this version both in a traditional format and as an open gaming SRD around which other games may be built. It is based heavily on the original Traveller, with updated careers and technology. It is referred to as "MgT" or "MGT" to differentiate it from "MT", or MegaTraveller. The core rule book was released in April 2008, with a regular series of supplements following.

Traveller5 
In 2013, Far Future Enterprises published a new set of rules by re-working and integrating concepts from earlier rulesets. The Traveller5 Core Rules book is a rules mechanics reference, pulled from Traveller adventures and toolbox material from supplements. 

Its update, v5.10, was reprinted in 2019 after a successful crowdfunding campaign, with errata and a new format, this time breaking down the game rules into three distinct books: Characters and Combat, Starships, and Worlds and Adventures.

Mongoose Traveller 2nd Ed. 
A second edition of Mongoose's Traveller was published in 2016 and updated in 2022. It uses a full color production style while resembling the original Traveller rules in scope. This edition is not licensed under the Open Game License. The second edition core rules include pre-career university and military academy education options. Skills specialization have been reorganized to reduce skill bloat. Some equipment descriptions have been altered and spacecraft operations and combat now have a different approach. Additional supplements flesh out rules further, including a revision to High Guard to handle all starship design.

Reception
In the April–May 1978 edition of White Dwarf (Issue #6), Don Turnbull gave a strong recommendation for the new game, saying, "Altogether, what is here is very satisfactory and much of it is stimulating. The presentation is exemplary, the detail impressive, the treatment exacting and the inventiveness inspired."

In the September 1978 edition of Dragon (Issue 18), Tony Watson complimented the game on the high production value of its components, saying, "Physically, Traveller is first class, a tradition with Game Designer's Workshop. The box lid and covers of the three booklets are done in a simple but highly effective combination of red and white lettering on a black background. The interior layout and printing is also of the best quality; the printing is an entirely professional job." Watson liked that experience points were not emphasized in gameplay: "It is refreshing to see that the adventures and color of the game's play is reward enough and the players are not channeling their energy into the rather silly chase of ethereal experience points. Too often, this chase becomes more important than actual play itself!" He concluded with a strong recommendation, saying, "Traveller is a unique SF game and probably the best of the role-playing variety. It offers a colorful but consistent future for players to adventure in."

In the inaugural edition of Ares (March 1980), David Ritchie was enthusiastic about Traveller, giving it an above average rating of 8 out of 9 and commenting, "This game starts off where Dungeons and Dragons left off, but, if there is any justice, will end up being more popular than that venerable relic. For one thing, the Traveller rules are fairly consistent (moreso than is usual for such games)."

In the May–June 1980 edition of The Space Gamer (Issue No. 28), Forrest Johnson gave a good review, saying, "Traveller is the best game of its type, recommended for the sophisticated science fiction gamer."

In the November 1980 edition of Ares (Issue #5), Eric Goldberg called Traveller "a most impressive achievement from a design standpoint... This mark of distinction is the main reason why I consider Traveller the finest commercially available role-playing game." Goldberg didn't consider it perfect, criticizing the game's lack of imaginary vision of technology of the future. Although he liked the "sophisticated and elegant" character generation system, he felt that "All too often, a player will have to spend an entire afternoon rolling dice before he gains a reasonable character." Goldberg concluded with a positive recommendation: "If you have at least a casual interest in science fiction and role-playing, you should definitely invest in a copy of Traveller"

In the 1980 book The Complete Book of Wargames, game designer Jon Freeman commented, "Traveller is the only serious attempt to provide a really comprehensive set of role-playing rules for science fiction: interstellar travel, exploration, trade, combat at all levels, and so on." Freeman warned potential players, "Considering the territory it seeks to cover, Traveller is necessarily complex, and it presumes on the part of the potential referee considerable familiarity with other role-playing games and the literature of science fiction." Freeman gave this game an Overall Evaluation of "Good", concluding, "For experienced players wishing a truly open-ended, science fiction, role-playing campaign, there is no real alternative."

In the October–November 1981 edition of White Dwarf, Andy Slack reviewed the Deluxe Traveller Edition, a compilation of the three original rules booklets, plus Book 0 - An Introduction to Traveller, and an adventure, "The Imperial Fringe". Slack thought this edition was better laid out, and "typos have been rectified." Because he believed that this edition was not substantially different than the original set, he only rated this edition a 4 out of 10 for experienced players who already owned the original rule booklets; but for new players, he rated it a perfect 10 out of 10.

In the inaugural edition of Games International (October 1988), Jake Thornton  gave MegaTraveller an above-average rating of 4 out of 5, saying, "Although there are some typos and omissions, overall, MegaTraveller is a success. If you like your SF on a grand, starspanning scale [...] then MegaTraveller is the system for you."

Chris W. McCubbin reviewed Traveller: The New Era for Pyramid #2 (July/Aug. 1993) and concluded that, despite some complaints he had about the new version, "Traveller'''s still around and that's good. I hope it always will be."

In the August 1997 edition of Dragon (Issue 238), Rick Swan reviewed the fourth edition of Traveller, and called it "a masterful effort... the best science-fiction RPG I've ever played." On the downside, Swan thought that "The inclusion of anachronistic weapons like swords and crossbows can turn combat into a bad episode of Star Trek." He also pointed out that character growth in the game is very slow: "PCs acquire new skills and abilities about as fast as a tree trunk acquires new growth rings." He also wanted to see more setting information. But he concluded that the fourth edition of Traveller was close to perfect, giving it a top rating of 6 out of 6 and saying, "Time-tested and buffed to a sheen, Traveller will endure as long there's enough plastic to manufacture six-sided dice."

In a 1996 reader poll by Arcane magazine to determine the 50 most popular roleplaying games of all time, Traveller (as either Traveller, MegaTraveller, or Traveller: The New Era) was ranked 3rd. The magazine's editor Paul Pettengale commented: "Although originally intended as a generic science fiction system, Traveller quickly became linked with the Imperium campaign background developed by GDW... This background offers a great degree of freedom for individual referees to run campaigns of their own devising, while providing enough basic groundwork to build from, and has proved to be immensely successful. Everything from political intrigue to action-packed mercenary actions, trading or scientific exploration is possible, and a lot more besides.... Traveller [is] one of the true classics of the roleplaying hobby".

AwardsTraveller: The New Era won the 1993 Origins Award for Best Roleplaying Rules.Traveller: The New Era won the 1994 Origins Award for Best Roleplaying Rules.

In 1996, Traveller was inducted into the Origins Hall of Fame.

 In other media 
 Software The Imperial Data Recovery System is a computer program published by FASA in 1981 as a play aid to speed up bookkeeping for Traveller, and assist with game aspects such as sector maps, records of characters and ships, and in-game encounters. John M. Morrison reviewed The Imperial Data Recovery System in The Space Gamer No. 50. Morrison commented that "I would seriously recommend that FASA take this off the market and re-write it from the ground up. There's definitely room for a Traveller aid program on the market, but not this one."

GDW licensee Paragon produced two video games based on the Traveller universe:
 MegaTraveller 1: The Zhodani Conspiracy (1990) for Amiga, Atari ST, and MS-DOS
 MegaTraveller 2: Quest for the Ancients (1991) for Amiga and MS-DOS

TravellerMap is an interactive map detailing the primary setting for Traveller. While it was originally fan-made, it has been made canon by reference, which reference states that what appears in real life on that site is what appears in-universe to users of a certain widely used stellar navigational tool.

  Novels 
Several novels have been specifically set in the various Traveller universes:

 Gregory P. Lee's The Laughing Lip series acknowledges the influence of Traveller in the development of the three novels published to date. Lee also wrote the Gamelords supplement Lee's Guide to Interstellar Adventure in the early 1980s.
 Jefferson P. Swycaffer has written several novels set in the "Concordat" fictional universe he originally developed for his Traveller campaign.
 There are two different Backwards Mask books in the Death of Wisdom trilogy. The manuscript by the original author (Brunette) was lost until shortly after the replacement manuscript (by Carson) was published. The original was then published for those who wanted it, and Carson's serves as an alternate end to the trilogy.

 Periodicals 
Gaming magazine White Dwarf ran a comic strip called The Travellers by Mark Harrison from 1983 to 1986. The strip spoofed Traveller and other space opera settings.

 Music 
The concept album Traveller by heavy metal band The Lord Weird Slough Feg is based on the game.

 Related role-playing games 

 Traveller: 2300 or 2300 AD

Originally published by GDW as an updated replacement for Traveller, eschewing classic space opera to take inspiration from the grittier contemporary hard science fiction media of the 1980s. The first edition was named Traveller: 2300, which incited both confusion and criticism since the game carried over neither the rules nor setting of its namesake. The second edition was renamed 2300 AD, and added some cyberpunk rules and adventures. It is presented as a future extrapolation of the speculative World War III of GDW's popular military role-playing game Twilight: 2000. In the 2300 AD setting, interstellar travel is relatively new, Earth is still divided into nation-states, and the most powerful nations are competitively exploring and colonizing the fifty light-year sphere of surrounding space. Mongoose Publishing released a sourcebook for the setting in 2012 that adapted it to their version of the Traveller rules.

 Cultural impact 

Computer programs have been created to model and predict starship combat using Traveller rules. The most famous case involved Douglas Lenat applying his Eurisko heuristic learning program to the scenario in the Traveller adventure Trillion Credit Squadron'', which contains rules for resolving large space battles statistically. Eurisko exploited corner-case features and built unusual fleets that won the 1981 and 1982 championships. The sponsor stated that if Lenat entered and won the next year they would stop the sponsorship, so Lenat stopped attending.

See also 
 Striker (miniatures game)

References

Further reading

External links 
 
 Far Future Enterprises
 GURPS Traveller
 Mongoose Traveller
 Traveller wiki
 TravellerMap: (a map of the official setting)

Origins Award winners
Permadeath games
Role-playing games introduced in 1977
Space opera role-playing games
Traveller (role-playing game)
Role-playing game systems